The United Nations trust territories were the successors of the remaining League of Nations mandates, and came into being when the League of Nations ceased to exist in 1946. All the trust territories were administered through the United Nations Trusteeship Council. The concept is distinct from a territory temporarily and directly governed by the United Nations.

The one League of Nation mandate not succeeded by a trust territory was South West Africa, at South Africa's insistence. South Africa's apartheid regime refused to commit to preparing the territory for independence and majority rule, as required by the trust territory guidelines, among other objections. South-West Africa eventually gained independence in 1990 as Namibia.

All trust territories have either attained self-government or independence. The last was Palau, formerly part of the Trust Territory of the Pacific Islands, which became a member state of the United Nations in December 1994.

Trust territories (and administering powers)

Former German 
All these territories previously were League of Nations mandates.

Former German and Japanese colonies

Former Italian possessions

Proposed trust territories
 Jerusalem: Under the United Nations Partition Plan for Palestine, Jerusalem would have become a corpus separatum territory under United Nations Trusteeship Council administration. Both Palestinian Arabs and the Yishuv opposed this solution. 
 Korea: In wartime talks, Franklin D. Roosevelt proposed that Korea be placed under an American–Soviet trust administration. The plan was eclipsed after Roosevelt's death on 12 April 1945, although it was expressed in the December Moscow Conference, and caused considerable civil unrest in Korea.
Vietnam: Roosevelt also proposed that French Indochina be placed under an international trusteeship as an alternative to French colonial rule and immediate independence. 
 Italian Libya: Between 1945 and 1947 the Soviet Union made various proposals that Tripolitania be placed under Soviet trusteeship for ten years, or a joint trusteeship with the United Kingdom and the United States, or that Libya as a whole become an Italian trusteeship.
 Mandatory Palestine: The United States government under Harry Truman proposed a UN trusteeship status for the Mandatory Palestine in 1948.
 Ryukyu Islands and Bonin Islands: the Treaty of San Francisco included provisions which provided the United States the right to convert its administration over the Ryukyu and Bonin Islands into a trust territory, but it never did so before sovereignty was voluntarily reverted to Japan.

See also 

 List of territories governed by the United Nations

References

Bibliography
 The United Nations and Decolonization: Trust Territories that Have Achieved Self-Determination
 WorldStatesmen – Index of Possessions and Colonies

External links
 

Decolonization
 *
 *
States and territories established in 1946
States and territories disestablished in 1994
20th century in international relations
Governance of the British Empire